2013 CEMAC Cup was the eighth edition of the CEMAC Cup, the football championship of Central African nations.
The tournament was held in Franceville and Bitam of Gabon from December 9–21.

Group A
Source:

Gabon
Coach: Stéphane Bounguendza

Group B

Chad
Coach: Modou Kouta

References

CEMAC Cup